Lupara is a comune (municipality) in the Province of Campobasso in the Italian region Molise, located about  north of Campobasso.

Lupara borders the following municipalities: Casacalenda, Castelbottaccio, Civitacampomarano, Guardialfiera, Morrone del Sannio.

References

Cities and towns in Molise